is a Japanese manga written and illustrated by Riichi Ueshiba. It was originally published as a one-shot story in 2004 before becoming a serialized comic in Kodansha's Monthly Afternoon magazine in 2006. The manga is licensed in North America by Vertical. An anime adaptation by Hoods Entertainment aired in Japan from April to June 2012, with an original video animation episode released in August 2012.

Plot
The series follows the relationship of Akira Tsubaki and Mikoto Urabe. Urabe is a transfer student who recently came to Tsubaki's school. After a series of strange events, Tsubaki finds himself addicted to Urabe's drool. Once she claims the addiction as love sickness, the relationship slowly progresses, focusing on the odd bond that comes out of the drool attachment.

As the story progresses, the relationship between the two deepens into genuine love. The manga strongly foreshadows that they will never break up, but rather will stay together for life.

Characters

Main

 Very little is known about Urabe, as Tsubaki's occasional visits to her apartments have never shown her parents to be around. She initially transfers to Tsubaki's school and gives off an unsocial air, refusing to eat lunch with her classmates in order to sleep. One day, she breaks out in hysterical laughter during class, falling to the ground. When later telling Tsubaki about it, she reveals to him that she heard a voice saying that he would be her very first intimate partner.
Urabe is very knowledgeable about the bond of drool that she and Tsubaki share. She displays her feeling through her drool, as her face is generally hidden behind her bangs. She has been shown to see Tsubaki's dreams through his drool, as well as use her own drool to cause him to have certain dreams. As the series progresses, she makes friends with Ayuko Oka, who also happens to share a drool bond with Urabe. Although she generally keeps quiet about her private life, she has been shown to be very sincere to her boyfriend, Tsubaki.
Among her many other quirks, Urabe is notable for her skill with scissors. The scissors, which she keeps tucked in her underwear, can be used to dextrously cut objects at high speed, like making a nearby hedge resemble Tsubaki. The scissors are used as threats, displays of anger, and as a defensive measure. This is but one of the factors that keeps Tsubaki from being more forward and aggressive with their relationship, although he seems to be generally fine with following Urabe's pace.

Tsubaki is an average boy by most standards. He lives with his sister and his father. His mother died when he was very young, prompting his sister to fulfill the motherly role instead. When Urabe transfers into his class, he is initially intrigued by her, particularly after one outburst of her hysterically laughing. After school one day, he wakes Urabe up from her desk, only to find a puddle of drool left behind. Absent-mindedly, he takes some on his finger and tastes it. Shortly afterwards, he falls ill. When Urabe visits him, she claims that he is suffering from "love-sickness", which he most likely got from tasting her drool. From there, the relationship begins, and Tsubaki quickly asks Urabe to be his girlfriend. Although she accepts, he continually feels that there is too much distance between them. Although they rarely have any physical contact, the two begin a ritual where Tsubaki tastes a bit of Urabe's drool each day. The drool can transmit feelings, among other things, between the two of them.
Tsubaki is not very aggressive in his pursuit of furthering his relationship with Urabe, slightly due to his fear of Urabe's scissors. He constantly compares his relationship to Kouhei's and Ayuko's, and will occasionally try to emulate them. He develops a taste for girls who look like Urabe, as evidenced by his collection of Urabe look-alike Japanese idol Momoka Imai's photos. Eventually she cuts them up with a double scissors attack.

Ayuko is Kouhei's girlfriend and Urabe's eventual friend. She was first introduced when Tsubaki walked into his homeroom to see her and Kouhei kissing together. She is rather short (143cm tall), yet she has a body which resembles a model, which she seems to enjoy on occasion when she dresses her favorite clothes out of her boyfriend's permission. After she sees the drool-tasting ritual between Tsubaki and Urabe, she befriends Urabe, and it's revealed that they share a drool bond as well. Ayuko is portrayed as slightly lecherous, given by her positive reaction to peeking down Urabe's blouse. She views her relationship with Kouhei almost as a competition with Urabe and Tsubaki.

Kouhei is Tsubaki's friend and Ayuko's boyfriend. When Tsubaki first walked in on him and Ayuko kissing, Kouhei asked him to keep their relationship a secret, as he is rather shy about it. He helps Tsubaki by providing advice about relationships. Kouhei is shown to be very jealous of Ayuko, and does not like the idea of taking her to the beach. He also tries to keep some control by dressing her more conservative in order to avoid other boys from seeing her.

Tsubaki's elder sister. She considers it her duty to raise her brother properly in place of their deceased mother, and refuses to consider getting married until he graduates and finds a job. She spends her time housekeeping. Tsubaki's occasional strange behavior from the effects of Urabe's saliva sometimes makes Youko worry about her brother. Youko has met Urabe, but has not been told of the full extent of her relationship with Tsubaki. Urabe said she was only a classmate Tsubaki helps often at school, though some dialogue suggests she knows the truth. Urabe told her in chapter 85 of volume 11 in the bath house.

Supporting

A beautiful, long-haired girl who was Tsubaki's classmate and first crush in middle school. She knew of his feelings for her, but never told him, and attended a different high school after graduation. Out of all of the cast she has a very possessive personality, faking a bruise to trick Tsubaki to pretend to be her boyfriend for a day and setting it up so Urabe will come to the festival during that time. However, after clearing up everything with her boyfriend they returned to being a couple again. Another note is that she and Tsubaki have similar quirks.

A media idol who looks almost identical to Urabe, except that she has brown hair and much smaller breasts. She makes an appearance in Chapter 37, and seems to have much more in common with Urabe than one would expect, though more energetic. Like how Urabe uses scissors on people, she kicks, though she wears restraints, however both are located where their panties are. She sought out Urabe in hopes she will agree to her plan of switching between model and student, however Urabe completely turns her down. After accidentally knocking her out (and Urabe cutting off all of her clothing), she discovers the difference in their breast sizes, seeming to have changed her mind after discovering this. After seeing Urabe and Tsubaki's bond, she goes with her promise and lets go of her plan to switch places, however not before stealing Urabe's uniform and going to make Tsubaki taste her drool. It is revealed she wanted to become a "normal" girl due to an incident with a boy she had a crush on before she became famous. Then after being discovered and becoming famous, she finally gained up the courage to confess her feelings to him, but before they kissed he asked if he could tell his friends he was dating a famous girl. Realizing he only liked her because she was famous, she high kicked him in the head.

Tsubaki and Urabe's beautiful classmate. She seems to have a crush on Tsubaki and frequently drops hints about that. Being responsible for collecting the class handouts along with Tsubaki, both of them have to stay back after school sometimes. This makes their other classmates think that they both like each other. According to Tsubaki, Suwano has ″gentle soothing eyes″. Suwano is one of the few people who know about Tsubaki and Urabe's ″drool relationship″. Suwano is good in swimming and has a flair for dramatics too. She later gets a boyfriend in a chapter called Mysterious Shutter Chance.

Minor

A popular, good-looking classmate of Tsubaki and Urabe who is also a star player of the school soccer team. He is interested in Urabe, and tries to ask her out, but she turns him down because, unlike Tsubaki, his body has no reaction to her drool.

An attractive, short-haired schoolmate of Tsubaki who is one grade below him. She and Tsubaki met through the school film club. She likes Tsubaki because they share unusual tastes in movies. Although Tsubaki in turn enjoys talking to her, he worries that the attention she gives him will make Urabe jealous. Later she is announced to be the film club vice president in the chapter Mysterious Film Club Production. 

The idol of class 2-C. A beautiful and talented athlete with large breasts and an outwardly nice personality, but vain. She holds a rivalry with Suwano Ryouko, her former middle school classmate. Suwano says she is the type of person who likes to watch others embarrass themselves while also liking to be the center of attention herself.

Media

Manga
Mysterious Girlfriend X is written and illustrated by Riichi Ueshiba. A one-shot chapter was first published in Kodansha's seinen manga magazine Monthly Afternoon in 2004. It was then serialized in the same magazine from March 25, 2006, to September 25, 2014. Kodansha collected its chapters in twelve tankōbon volumes, released from August 23, 2006 to November 21, 2014.

The manga is available in English as part of a read-only/download-only subscription from Crunchyroll and Kodansha. Vertical licensed the series for release in North America, and released the manga in six omnibus volumes from spring 2016 to summer 2017.

Volumes list

Anime
An anime adaptation by Hoods Entertainment aired in Japan between April 7, 2012 and June 30, 2012 and was simulcast by Crunchyroll. An original video animation episode was released with the ninth volume of the manga on August 23, 2012. The series has been licensed in North America by Sentai Filmworks and began streaming on The Anime Network and Hulu 31 days following its airdate. Sentai Filmworks released a box-set containing the entire 13 episode TV series on Blu-ray and DVD June 11, 2013. An English dub was released in Australia by Hanabee Entertainment on June 5, 2013.

Episode list

OVA

References

External links
 

2006 manga
2012 anime OVAs
2012 anime television series debuts
Hoods Entertainment
Kodansha manga
Romantic comedy anime and manga
School life in anime and manga
Seinen manga
Sentai Filmworks
Tokyo MX original programming
Vertical (publisher) titles